Prior to its uniform adoption of proportional representation in 1999, the United Kingdom used first-past-the-post for the European elections in England, Scotland and Wales. The European Parliament constituencies used under that system were smaller than the later regional constituencies and only had one Member of the European Parliament each.

The constituency of Greater Manchester West was one of them.

From 1979 to 1984, it consisted of the Westminster Parliament constituencies of Altrincham and Sale, Bolton East, Bolton West, Eccles, Farnworth, Leigh, Salford East, Salford West, and Stretford.  From 1984 to 1994 it consisted of Bolton North East, Bolton South East, Bolton West, Bury North, Bury South, Eccles, Salford East, and Worsley.  From 1994 to 1999 it consisted of Bolton North East, Bolton South East, Bolton West, Bury South, Davyhulme, Eccles, Salford East, and Worsley.

MEPs

Election results

References

External links
 David Boothroyd's United Kingdom Election Results 

European Parliament constituencies in England (1979–1999)
Politics of Greater Manchester
1979 establishments in England
1999 disestablishments in England
Constituencies established in 1979
Constituencies disestablished in 1999